HMS Saudadoes was built by Anthony Deane after his transfer to Portsmouth Dockyard (Harwich Dockyard was closed at the end of 1667) as the Master Shipwright. She was a smaller version of the Greyhound design. Initially she was a 8/6-gun sixth rate vessel. She was rebuilt in 1673 as a standard 16-gun vessel. She was commissioned in November 1669 then taken in hand at Deptford for her rebuild. She spent the majority of her career in Home Waters, participating in the Battle of Bantry Bay (as a fireship) and the Battle of Barfleur. She went to the Mediterranean for a year in 1694. Her final service was in the Channel where she was captured by two French privateers and burnt in February 1696.

Saudadoes was the first named vessel in the Royal Navy.

Design and specifications
Her construction dates little is known other than her launch date. The ship was launched at Portsmouth Dockyard on 28 November 1669. Her draught was only . Her tonnage was calculated as 83 84/94 tons.

Her initial armament was listed as eight to six 6-pounder muzzle loading smooth bore guns mounted on wooden trucks.

Commissioned Service
Her initial commission was under Captain Nicholas Hill, RN on 6 November 1669 until 4 January 1670. She again came under his command on 9 May 1670 until his death on 9 June 1671. On 11 July 1671 Captain James Jenifer, RN took command. He remained in command through her rebuild in 1673.

1673 Rebuild at Deptford Dockyard
Of her rebuild dates little is known other than it occurred in 1673 and was at Deptford. Her draught was only . Her tonnage was calculated as 181 89/94 tons. Her gun armament after the rebuild was now eighteen to sixteen 6-pounder muzzle loading smooth bore guns on wooden trucks. By 1685 her armament was changed to four demi-culverin cutts, six 6-pounders, four sakers and two 3-pounders all on wooden trucks.

Continued Service
Continuing under Captain Jenifer, upon completion of her rebuild she proceeded to Lisbon with Narbrough's squadron in 1673. In 1676 she was on 'Queen's service', Captain Jenifer died on 9 July 1677. Captain Richard Trevanion, RN took over command on 21 July 1677 until 15 May 1678. Captain Trevanion reassumed command on 16 October 1678 for service off Scotland in 1679. She was in the Channel in 1680. She participated in the capture of Monmouth's ships on 20 June 1685. Captain John Beverley, RN took command on 10 April 1687 until 1688 then Captain John Gradon, RN took on 29 May 1678 until 1689.

In April 1689 she came under the command of Captain Francis Wyvill, RN. The ship was configured as a fireship and participated in the Battle of Bantry Bay on the south coast of Ireland on 1 May 1689. She was reconfigured as a sixth rate and came under the command of Captain Rodger Newton, RN on 15 May 1690 for service in the Channel. Captain William Prowther took over in July 1691. She participated in the Battle of Barfleur from 19 to 24 May 1692. In 1693 Captain William Jumper, RN was in command. On 12 July 1693 Captain Edmund Loades, RN took command. Captain George Trenchard, RN took command on 14 February 1694 for service in the Mediterranean. On her return to Home Waters Captain Thomas Day, RN took command on 5 August 1695.

Disposition
Saudadoes was taken and burnt by two large French privateers off the North Coast of France on 23 February 1696.

Notes

Citations

References
 Winfield, British Warships in the Age of Sail (1603 – 1714), by Rif Winfield, published by Seaforth Publishing, England © 2009, EPUB , Chapter 6, The Sixth Rates, Vessels acquired from 2 May 1660, 1669 - 75 Construction, Saudadoes
 Colledge, Ships of the Royal Navy, by J.J. Colledge, revised and updated by Lt Cdr Ben Warlow and Steve Bush, published by Seaforth Publishing, Barnsley, Great Britain, © 2020, e  (EPUB), Section S (Saudadoes)

 

1660s ships
Corvettes of the Royal Navy
Ships built in Portsmouth
Naval ships of the United Kingdom